The National Dramatic Theatre or National Theatre was a theatre in Rome, now demolished to build Via Nazionale.

History

Bibliography
Stefania Severi I teatri di Roma, Roma, Newton & Compton, 1989.

Theatres in Rome